Taekwondo, for the 2013 World Combat Games, took place at the Spartak - Sports Complex 'Arena', in Saint Petersburg, Russia. Preliminary rounds were contested on the 23 October 2013. Medals for this sport were awarded on the 24 October 2013.

Medal table
Key:

Medal summary

References

2013 World Combat Games
2013 World Combat Games events
World Combat Games
2013 World Combat Games